The 1955 Detroit Titans football team represented the University of Detroit in the Missouri Valley Conference (MVC) during 1955 college football season. In its second year under head coach Wally Fromhart, Detroit compiled a 5–3–1 record (3–1 against conference opponents), tied for the MVC championship, and outscored all opponents by a combined total of 100 to 62.

The team's staff included Kenneth Stilley (line coach, third year), Robert Dove (end coach, first year), John Ray (freshman coach, first year), and Dr. Raymond D. Forsyth (team physician). Tackle Richard Quadri and halfback Francis O'Connor were the team co-captains.

Schedule

References

External links
 1955 University of Detroit football programs

Detroit
Detroit Titans football seasons
Detroit Titans football
Detroit Titans football